St. Mary's North is a parliamentary constituency in Saint Mary Parish, Antigua and Barbuda.

It has 4,322 registered voters as of 2018.

The constituencies counting centre is at the Antigua State College.

Demographics

Enumeration Districts 

 35100 Golden Grove
 81900 Jennings-Central
 82000 Jennings-South 
 82101  Jennings-Yorks_1 
 82102  Jennings-Yorks_2 
 82200 Jennings-CedarHall 
 82300 EbenezerHall
 82400 Ebenezer-GreenHill 
 34100 Bendals
 34201  Emmanuel_1 
 34202  Emmanuel_2 
 14400 Browne's Ave.

2011 Census

Voting Trends

Members of Parliament

References 

Constituencies of Antigua and Barbuda
Saint Mary Parish, Antigua and Barbuda
1971 establishments in Antigua and Barbuda
Constituencies established in 1971